The Cagiva Mito is a small-engined Cagiva sports motorcycle. The powerplant consists of a two-stroke  single-cylinder engine.

History and development

The Cagiva Mito was the first bike of Valentino Rossi, eventual 9 time MotoGP world champion. In 1994, Rossi had been provided a factory Mito by Cagiva team manager Claudio Lusuardi and cruised to the Italian title.

During the 1990s the Mito was the arch-rival to Aprilia's AF1 125 FUTURA and later the RS125, a similar 2-stroke 125 cc race-replica.

In 2012, production of new Mitos was suspended. Increasingly stringent environmental emission requirements and the concentration of resources on MV Agusta's F3 were cited as reasons. The last few Mito SP525s produced were white in colour, and personally signed by MV Agusta CEO Giovanni Castiglioni.

Models

Mk I/II and SP

The Mito was introduced in 1989 as the Mk I. The Mk II followed with minor changes such as upside down forks and a new front mudguard. The SP versions featured Marchesini rims and uprated suspension.

The SP models also featured different engine and ignition parts.

Evolution I and II

In 1994 the bike was restyled by Massimo Tamburini with similar lines to the then new Ducati 916, a design he also penned. The similarity is particularly visible in the front and rear fairings.

The Evo I is identified by the 3 spoke rims and the 7 speed gearbox, grey lower panels, solid colours on the tail section.

The Evo II is identified by the 6 spoke rims and the 6 speed gearbox, solid colour lower panels, white area on the tail section.

In February 2007, Malaysian company MOFAZ announced that they will be locally assembling the last batch of the Mito 125 Evolution for Malaysian buyers. The bike will be known as the Momos Cagiva Mito 125 Fauzy's Edition and only 300 will be made for the production run.

In late 2009 Cagiva dropped the Evolution model, leaving just the Mito SP525 and Raptor 125 in the lineup.

SP525

In 2005, at the EICMA motorcycle show, Cagiva launched a limited production tuned competition version of the Mito known as the SP525. This is something of a homage to the Cagiva GP500 (C594) racing bike.  Front and rear fairings were modified to look more like the C594, eight-spoke forged aluminium wheels were added, while speedometer, lights and mirrors were removed to reduce the overall weight. The bike is not road-legal.

For 2008, Cagiva added the Mito SP525 road bike (not to be confused with the racing SP525 above) alongside the Mito Evo II. In terms of looks, the new bike inherits some stylistic traits from the competition SP525, essentially similar front and rear fairings.

On a technical level, the bike retains much the same rolling chassis as the Evo and the engine is still a 125 cc two-stroke, but has had several changes, notably a new Electronic Carburetion System (developed in conjunction with Dell'Orto) governing both fuel-air, oil-mix and ignition, allowing it to pass tougher Euro 3 emissions regulations.

Mito 500

In November 2006 at EICMA, Cagiva unveiled the Mito 500 concept bike. The two-stroke 125 cc engine has been replaced with a fuel-injected, four-stroke  DOHC single, courtesy of Husqvarna. Replacing the two-stroke's expansion chamber exhaust is a tiny, seemingly unbaffled system, its exit just visible at the rear of the underside fairing. With forged alloy wheels it weighs in at  - just  more than the Mito 125.

Naked variants

Planet
In 1998, Cagiva added a naked equivalent to the Mito Evo, named the Planet which bears some resemblance to the Ducati Monster. The Planet, unlike the Aprilia Tuono, has been given all new fairings including a fuel tank which can hinge upwards allowing access for space to store an open face helmet.

Raptor 125
In 2003, Cagiva discontinued the Planet and renamed the particular motorcycle in 2004 as the Raptor 125 which is essentially the same however with changes to the appearance.

Performance
 Maximum Power:
Evolution -  @12,000 rpm
Mito SP 525 ('09) -  @12,000 rpm
Mito 500 - 60 hp

Notes and references

External links

 Official Cagiva Website

Mito
Sport bikes
Motorcycles introduced in 1989
Motorcycles designed by Massimo Tamburini
Two-stroke motorcycles
Single-cylinder motorcycles